Michael David Pfeifer (born May 18, 1937) is an American prelate of the Roman Catholic Church.  He served as bishop of the Diocese of San Angelo in Texas from 1985 to 2012.

Biography

Early life 
Michael Pfeifer was born on May 18, 1937 in Alamo, Texas, the son of Maund Pfeifer and Alice Clausney Savage. He grew up on a family farm, dealing with periods of poverty. Pfeifer entered St. Anthony’s Junior Seminary at age 13. He took his first vows with the Missionary Oblates of Mary Immaculate on May 31,1958

On December 21, 1964, Pfeifer was ordained into the priesthood by Bishop Stephen Leven for the Missionary Oblates of Mary Immaculate.  After his ordination, Pfeifer served as a missionary in Mexico for several years.

Bishop of San Angelo 
On May 31, 1985, Pope John Paul II named Pfeifer as bishop of the Diocese of San Angelo.  He was consecrated by Archbishop Patrick Flores at the San Angelo Coliseum on July 26, 1985.

Pfeifer has spoken against medical research using embryonic stem cells, instead promoting the use of adult stem cells.

On December 17, 2008, Pfeifer and the Diocese of San Angelo were sued by a San Angelo man.  The plaintiff claimed that David Espitia, pastor of St. Ann's Parish in Colorado City, Texas, had sexually abused him from 1994, when he was age eight, to 2002 and that the diocese covered up the crimes.  In response, Pfeifer said that Espita told him on June 13, 2003 about the allegations and denied all of them. At that time, Pfeifer initiated an investigation. A week after his meeting with Pfeifer, Espita committed suicide.  On November 21, 2011, the diocese reached an out-of-court settlement with the plaintiff.

The 2018 Pennsylvania Grand Jury Report on sexual abuse by clergy included a section on the transfer of Thomas C. Kelley, a priest from the Diocese of Erie in Pennsylvania, to the Diocese of San Angelo, despite a record of sexual abuse of young men.  Five men aged 28 to 25 accused Kelley of sexual advances either at a high school or in the seminary;  one man received a financial settlement from the Diocese of Erie.  Kelley was sent to for psychological treatment twice; both facilities released him with recommendations that the have no contact with young parishioners.   

In 1995, Kelley requested a transfer to the Diocese of San Angelo. Pfeifer had a conversation in 1995 with Erie Bishop Donald Trautman in which they discussed Kelley's record and his transfer. Pfeiffer eventually agreed to Kelley's transfer without any restrictions.  There were no allegations of abuse filed against Kelley during his ten years in the Diocese of San Angelo; he died in 2005  Pfeifer has refused to comment on the story.  Bishop Michael Sis, the current bishop of San Angelo, said he felt hurt and angry about the Kelley allegations. 

Pfeifer submitted his resignation letter as bishop of San Angelo to Pope Benedict XVI on his 75th birthday on May 18, 2012. Pope Francis accepted Pfeifer's resignation on December 12, 2013.

See also
 

 Catholic Church hierarchy
 Catholic Church in the United States
 Historical list of the Catholic bishops of the United States
 List of Catholic bishops of the United States
 Lists of patriarchs, archbishops, and bishops

References

External links
 The Diocese of San Angelo Official Site
  Bishop Michael Pfeifer: 25 years of compassion

Episcopal succession

1937 births
Roman Catholic Ecclesiastical Province of San Antonio
Living people
People from Hidalgo County, Texas
Religious leaders from Texas
Catholics from Texas
Missionary Oblates of Mary Immaculate